Hans-Jürgen Krupp (born 1933) is a German politician, economist, professor and former President of the University of Frankfurt. He was a representative of the Social Democratic Party (SPD) and state minister in Hamburg.

Krupp was born in 1933 in Elbing, East Prussia. He studied at the Technical College Darmstadt from 1952–1957, and received his doctorate (Dr. rer. pol.) in 1961. From 1969 to 1975 Krupp was professor for economics and social politics at the University of Frankfurt, from 1987 to 1993 also at the Technical University of Berlin. 1973–1975 he was vice-president, and until 1979 president of the University of Frankfurt. In 1979 Krupp became president of the German Institute for Economic Research.

In 1988 Krupp became state minister of Finance, and in 1991 state minister for Economic Affairs and second mayor of Hamburg. In 2001 he is retired.

References

External links 

1933 births
Living people
Mayors of Hamburg
Senators of Hamburg
Social Democratic Party of Germany politicians
Academic staff of the Technical University of Berlin
Academic staff of Goethe University Frankfurt